Big man may refer to:

Film and television 

The Big Man (1908 film), a 1908 Russian short drama
The Big Man, a 1990 film
Big Man (TV series), 2014 South Korean TV series
Big Men (film), a 2014 film

Music 

 "Big Man" (The Four Preps song), 1958
 "Big Man" (Chase & Status song), 2012
 "Big Man", a song by Status Quo from the album 1+9+8+2, 1982
 "Big Man, Big M.A.N.", a song from Crass's album Stations of the Crass

People 
 Bigman (beatboxer), South Korean beatboxer and musician 
 Clarence Clemons (1942–2011), nicknamed Big Man

Other 
 Big Man, a member of Deep Cut in Splatoon 3
 Big man (anthropology), the most influential man in a tribe
 Big man (basketball), type of player
 Big Man (comics), multiple Marvel Comics characters
 Big man (political science), a single person who wields autocratic rule of a country
 The Big Man (novel), a 1986 novel by William McIlvanney
 Great man theory, the idea that history can be largely explained by the actions of great men
 Kadanuumuu, a hominid fossil whose name means "big man" in the Afar language
 Really Really Big Man, a character from Rocko's Modern Life

See also
Little Man (disambiguation)